Sarıçam is a district-municipality in the Adana Province of Turkey. Southern section of the district is part of the Adana Urban Area. The district is located north of the Yüreğir district, east of the Seyhan River and the Seyhan Reservoir. It consists of former townships that are amalgamated to the city of Adana in 2008.

Çukurova University, Adana Science and Technology University, the New Adana Stadium and the Adana Industrial Park are located in Sarıçam.

Governance

Sarıçam district is administered by three levels of government; central government, provincial administration and the municipalities.

Sarıçam Governorship is the district branch of the central government operating under the Adana Governorship. The chief executive of the Sarıçam district is the District Governor who is appointed by the Ministry of Internal Affairs. Sarıçam Governorship overseas the functioning of the district directorates of the ministries.

Sarıçam directorate of the Adana Province Special Administration is the district branch of the provincial administration. Sarıçam district is represented with 5 members at the 61-member Adana Provincial Parliament.

Sarıçam district is divided into Sarıçam municipality and the villages.

Sarıçam Municipality

There is only one municipality incorporated in the Sarıçam district. Sarıçam Municipality is a lower tier municipality of City of Adana and serves the southern section of the district and it is further divided into neighborhoods.

Sarıçam Municipality was incorporated in 2008 as a lower-tier municipality of the city of Adana, after the split of the northern section from Yüreğir district. The organs of the Sarıçam Municipality are the mayor, encümen (the executive committee) and the municipal council.

Mayor is the chief executive of the municipality, presides municipal departments and chairs the municipal council. Mayoral candidates are either nominated by National Parties or run independently. The mayor is elected by first past the post voting for a 5-year term. Bilal Uludağ is the mayor of Sarıçam since 2014.  In the local elections in March 2014, he was elected with %47,7 of the popular votes.

	
|-
|1
|MHP
|align="right"|Bilal Uludağ
|align="right"|36,813
|align="right"|47,7
|-
|2
|AKP
|align="right"|Ahmet Zenbilci
|align="right"|29,290
|align="right"|37,9
|-
|3
|CHP
|align="right"|Cumali Yakan
|align="right"|7,989
|align="right"|10,3
|-
|4
|HDP
|align="right"|Mehmet Sait Meviş
|align="right"|1,252
|align="right"|1,6
|}

Encümen is the executive committee of the Sarıçam Municipality.The mayor presides the encümen and the committee consists of 7 members, 3 councilors elected from the municipal council, 3 department directors appointed by the mayor and the treasurer.

Municipal Council is the decision making organ of the Sarıçam Municipality. It is responsible for approving by-laws, founding, splitting or amalgamating neighborhoods, strategic planning, urban development planning and zoning, making investments, budgeting, loaning and controlling the mayor's activities. The chair of the council is the mayor. The council consists of 25 members. The candidates for the councilor positions are either nominated by National Parties or run independently. The councilors are elected by the d'Hondt method, where the whole municipality is one electoral district and there is 10% threshold for a party to gain seat at the council. As with mayor, councilors are elected for a 5-year term. Turkish nationalist MHP leads the council with 14 members and conservative AKP has 11 members at the council.

Villages

Villages are the smallest administrative units outside the urban areas.  Villages are administered by the muhtar and the Village Seniors Council. The council can have 4, 5 or 6 members depending on the population of the village. Unlike the neighborhood muhtars, village muhtars are granted special powers and the village administration is considered to be a governmental body.

In Sarıçam district, there are total of 37 villages scattered at the northern section of the district.

Neighborhoods

Neighborhoods (Mahalle) are administered by the muhtar and the Neighborhood Seniors Council consisting of 4 members. Muhtar and the Senior Council are elected for 5 years at the local elections and are not affiliated with political parties. Neighborhoods are not an incorporation therefore do not hold government status. Muhtar although being elected by the residents, acts merely as an administrator of the district governor. Muhtar also voices the neighborhood issues to the municipal hall together with the Seniors Council.

Sarıçam has total of 29 neighborhoods, 17 of the neighborhoods are in the urban area, 12 of them are outside.

Neighborhoods in the urban area

There are 17 urban neighborhoods in the Sarıçam municipality. 4 of these neighborhoods are ceded from Yüreğir municipality and the rest are the neighborhoods of the former Sofulu, İncirlik and Buruk municipalities.

Urban Neighborhoods ceded from Yüreğir district: The 4 neighborhoods are, Remzi Oğuz Arık, Çınarlı, Mehmet Akif Ersoy and Yıldırım Beyazıt.

Sofulu: The 8 neighborhoods are, Esentepe, Orhangazi, Sofudede, Şahintepe, Yeşiltepe, Yavuz Sultan Selim, Beyceli and Gültepe.

İncirlik:  The 3 neighborhoods are, Hürriyet, Kemalpaşa and Yeni Mahalle.

Buruk:  The 2 neighborhoods are, İstiklal and Cumhuriyet.

Neighborhoods outside the urban area

As the city borders expanded the municipalities and villages in the new limits of the city  are annexed to the city. Neighborhoods of the former municipalities and former villages then became part of the Sarıçam district as neighborhoods. There are total of 12 non-urban neighborhoods in Sarıçam.

Non-urban neighborhoods ceded from Yüreğir district: The 4 neighborhoods are, Çarkıpare, Bayramhacılı, Boybuyoğun and Ayvalı

Kürkçüler:  The 4 neighborhoods are, Göztepe, Müminli, Yürekli and Dağcı.

Suluca:  The 2 neighborhoods are, Karşıyaka and Acıdere.

Baklalı:  The 2 neighborhoods are, Küçükbaklalı and Büyükbaklalı.

References 

 
Populated places in Adana Province
Districts of Adana Province